The Order of Honor is an honor awarded by the President of Georgia. Established in 1992, The Order of Honor is awarded to a person in the construction of the state of Georgia - in the development of governance, defense, law and order, economy, health, culture, education, science, art or literature - for outstanding contribution, sporting achievement, heroism and devotion.

Insignia  
The Order of Merit has a round shape 38 millimeters in diameter.
A seven-pointed braided golden star rests on a silver field composed of circular layered morcal shapes.
In the middle of the braid, which is 20 millimeters in diameter, is a golden vine leaf with a seven-pointed silver Asterisk-like figure.
Among the star gills are six silver grains in the shape of a grape seed.

The stalk of the order is movably attached to a bracket with a 28 mm wide band. There is a wide blue stripe in the middle of the white background of the band. On both sides of the blue stripe are 2 mm wide red stripes.

The author of the Order of Honor is a graphic artist, artist-monumentalist Emir Burjanadze.

Recipients

See also
Orders, decorations, and medals of Georgia

References

Works cited

 

Orders, decorations, and medals of Georgia (country)